Dennis Eric Danell 
(June 24, 1961 – February 29, 2000) was an American musician, guitarist and co-founding member of the Southern California punk rock band Social Distortion.

Biography
Danell joined Social Distortion in 1979 while he and frontman Mike Ness attended Troy High School (Fullerton, CA) together. Mike recruited him to play guitar despite not yet knowing how to play an instrument. Due to this, the other members, Casey Royer and Rikk Agnew left as they did not want to wait for him to learn. When Social Distortion recorded its first single in 1981, Mainline/Playpen, Danell was the bassist, choosing this because it was "easier to play. I only had to hit single notes rather than forming chords". Shortly after the brief bass stint, Danell switched to guitar after Ness taught him how to play. His steady, melodic playing helped define the group's signature jangle on such albums as Mommy's Little Monster (1983), Prison Bound (1988), Social Distortion (1990), Somewhere Between Heaven and Hell (1992) and White Light, White Heat, White Trash (1996).

After Social Distortion went on hiatus following the release of Live at the Roxy in 1998, Danell produced numerous local bands at the group's recording studio, Casbah, in Fullerton, California. His production credits included Fanmail (BEC Records), Value Pac (Four Door Entertainment), Fraidy Cats (Bulletproof Records), The Deluxtone Rockets (Tooth & Nail Records), and Rock Star Barbecue, the debut artist on Danell's new independent label, Masterpiece Records. By 2000, Danell was quickly becoming a much sought-after producer in the Orange County area.

Danell also started a new side band called Strung Gurus, with Michael Knott of the Orange County band, Aunt Betty's (formerly on Elektra). Danell produced, co-wrote and played guitar for them, whilst working on their first full-length album. The Strung Gurus debut, to be the second release on Masterpiece Records, was nearly completed.

Death
Danell remained the guitarist for Social Distortion until his untimely death on Leap Day, 2000. Danell, aged 38, was at his Newport Beach, California home when he suddenly dropped dead in the driveway during a move to a new residence; the band's longtime manager reported that Danell died of cerebral aneurysm. According to other sources, the Orange County Coroner's Office lists his death as “Idiopathic Dilated Cardiomyopathy.” Mike Ness stated on the DVD commentary of Another State of Mind that Dennis died from a heart condition.

In May 2000, several stalwart Southern California punk bands performed a benefit concert for Danell's family at the Irvine Meadows Amphitheatre. The Offspring, X, TSOL, and Pennywise appeared, and Social Distortion performed with new member Johnny 2 Bags from Cadillac Tramps stepping in for Dennis.

References

1961 births
2000 deaths
American punk rock guitarists
Social Distortion members
20th-century American musicians
American male guitarists
20th-century American guitarists
20th-century American male musicians
Deaths from intracranial aneurysm